Hasan Hüseyin is a masculine name, a combination of the given names Hasan from Hasan ibn Ali, and Hüseyin from Husayn ibn Ali, the assassinated grandsons of Prophet Muhammad and both sons of Ali. It may refer to:

Hasan Hüseyin Acar (born 1994), Turkish footballer
Hasan Hüseyin Can (born 1960), Turkish civil servant
Hasan Hüseyin Kaçar (born 1988), Turkish Paralympian middle and long-distance runner